Donald Parrish (April 6, 1955 – May 8, 2021) was an American football defensive tackle in the National Football League for the Kansas City Chiefs. He was drafted by the Atlanta Falcons in the 12th round of the 1977 NFL Draft. He played college football at the University of Pittsburgh where he was part of the 1976 NCAA consensus national championship team.

He died on May 8, 2021, at age 66, in Tallahassee, Florida.

References

1955 births
2021 deaths
American football defensive tackles
Kansas City Chiefs players
Pittsburgh Panthers football players
Players of American football from Tallahassee, Florida